SPORT.LAND. Niederösterreich is a UCI continental team founded in 2013 and based in Austria. It participates in UCI Continental Circuits races.

Team roster

Major wins

2015
Belgrade–Banja Luka II, Andi Bajc
 National Time Trial Championships, Jan Tratnik
Stage 2 Tour de Hongrie, Marek Čanecký
Stage 4 Tour de Hongrie, Andi Bajc
Stage 5 Tour de Hongrie, Jan Tratnik
Overall East Bohemia Tour, Jan Tratnik
Stage 2, Jan Tratnik
Rund um Sebnitz, Maximilian Kuen
2016
Visegrad 4 Kerékpárverseny, Marek Čanecký
Stage 5 Okolo Slovenska, Jan Tratnik
 National Time Trial Championships, Marek Čanecký
 National Time Trial Championships, János Pelikán
 National Road Race Championships, Jan Tratnik
 National Road Race Championships, János Pelikán
Overall East Bohemia Tour, Jan Tratnik
Stage 2, Jan Tratnik
2017
Trofej Umag, Rok Korošec
Poreč Trophy, Matej Mugerli
Overall Istrian Spring Trophy, Matej Mugerli
Stage 2, Matej Mugerli
Stage 3 Tour d'Azerbaïdjan, Matej Mugerli
Stage 3 Okolo Slovenska, Matej Mugerli
 National Time Trial Championships, Marek Čanecký
2018
Overall Grand Prix Cycliste de Gemenc, Rok Korošec
Stage 1, Rok Korošec
V4 Special Series Debrecen–Ibrány, Péter Kusztor

National championship
2015
 Slovenia Time Trial, Jan Tratnik

2016
 Slovenia Road Race, Jan Tratnik
 Slovakia Time Trial, Marek Canecky
 Hungary Road Race, János Pelikán
 Hungary Time Trial, János Pelikán

2017
 Slovakia Time Trial, Marek Canecky

References

External links

UCI Continental Teams (Europe)
Cycling teams based in Austria
Cycling teams established in 2013
2013 establishments in Austria